The Dolphin Brothers were a new wave/alternative band featuring Steve Jansen and Richard Barbieri, both previously of the band Japan. The band released one album, Catch the Fall in 1987, featuring Jansen on drums, percussion, keyboards and lead vocals, and Barbieri on keyboards and synthesizers.

Additional personnel were: Phil Palmer, David Rhodes (acoustic and electric guitars); B. Heinrich-Keat (electric guitar), Clive Bell (Thai flute, khene, crumhorn); Carrie Booth (piano); Danny Thompson (double bass); Matthew Seligman, Robert Bell (bass); Martin Ditcham (percussion); Suzanne Murphy, Katie Kissoon, P.P. Arnold (backing vocals).

Discography
Catch the Fall
 "Catch the Fall"
 "Shining"
 "Second Sight"
 "Love That You Need"
 "Real Life, Real Answers"
 "Host to the Holy"
 "My Winter"
 "Pushing the River"

A bonus track was included on the Japanese edition of the album called "Face to Face".

References

English new wave musical groups
English musical duos
Male musical duos
New wave duos